Valentin Teodosiu (born 17 September 1953) is a Romanian actor. He appeared in more than fifty films since 1977. He is well known as the voice of channel ProTV since 1995.

Teodosiu was born in Bucharest and graduated in 1978 from the I.L. Caragiale Institute of Theatre and Film Arts. He was chosen by 20th Century Fox to dub Romanian Captain Gutt's voice for the animated movie, "Ice Age: Continental Drift".

Selected filmography

References

External links 

1953 births
Living people
Romanian male film actors
Male actors from Bucharest
Caragiale National University of Theatre and Film alumni